Israel competed at the 2012 Summer Paralympics in London, United Kingdom, from 29 August to 9 September.

The country was represented by twenty-five athletes (eighteen men and seven women), who competed in nine sports: athletics, equestrian, road cycling, rowing, sailing, shooting, swimming, table tennis, and wheelchair tennis. The Israeli athletes included six-time Paralympic shooting medallist Doron Shaziri.

Medalists

Athletics 

Men's Track and Road Events

Cycling

Road

Men

Women

Mixed

Equestrian

Rowing

Sailing 

* The 11th race was cancelled due to bad weather.

Shooting

Swimming 

Men

Women

Table tennis 

Men

Wheelchair Tennis

References

Nations at the 2012 Summer Paralympics
2012
Paralympics